The Mackle brothers - Elliott, Robert and Frank Jr. - were a group of three brothers who were real estate developers. They would popularize selling land in planned communities through installment plans in Florida creating several communities in the process.

Elliott J. Mackle would be born in 1908 and died in 1978. Frank E. Mackle Jr. would be born in Atlanta in 1916 and graduated with a civil engineering degree from Vanderbilt University in 1938. Frank would die at the age of 77 in Key Biscayne on July 29, 1993.

The Mackle Company would be founded in 1908 in Jacksonville by Frank E. Mackle Sr. who ran the company there before going to Miami in 1937. When he died, it would be taken over by Elliott, Robert and Frank. It would build an $18 million US Navy project in Key West before getting into large sized residential work. Originally the brothers would follow a strategy similar to that of the Levitts during the late 1940s building subdivisions around Miami. They would start to change approaches by 1955 building large retirement orientated communities in rural parts of Florida where there was large amounts of land that was also cheap.

The first installment company created by them would be the General Development Corporation (GDC) in 1958. It was formed as a merger between Florida Canada Corporation and Mackle Bros. The Mackle brothers would continue to lead the company until 1962 before selling the company to and taking over another company which "...had been the Cockshutt Farm Equipment Co., went through a period as C.K.P. Developments" before becoming the Deltona Corporation. Deltona would end up becoming a competitor to the GDC. The reason for there departure was because of a dispute involving the company's chairman, Gardner Cowles. Frank Mackle III joined Deltona in 1966 after he graduated from the University of Notre Dame.

Work began on developing Marco Island in 1969. The project at Marco Island would be the most ambitions project ever undertaken. It would not go over well as during the mid 1970s the Deltona Corporation would be denied permits for dredge and fill for waterfront development and would be ordered to give a refund of $38 million to those who paid for  waterfront property but didn't get it. Frank E. Mackle Jr. would leave Deltona in 1986 along with Frank Mackle III. Their departure was after the company had a takeover from "a huge Minnesota utility". During a 1981–1982 recession it would have 1,200 condominiums that couldn't be sold and "was on the verge of financial collapse" when a deal with the Topeka Group (a subsidiary of Minnesota Power & Light) went through.

Communities developed 
Beverly Hills
Citrus Springs
Coquina Key
Deltona
Key Biscayne
Marco Island
Marco Shores
North Port
Pine Ridge
Port Charlotte
Port St. Lucie
Seminole Woods
Spring Hill
St. Augustine Shores
Sunny Hills
Tampa Palms

See also 

 General Development Corporation

References

External links
Mackle Company website
 Deltona Corporation website

People from Florida